Project appraisal is the process of assessing, in a structured way, the case for proceeding with a project or proposal, or the project's viability. It often involves comparing various options, using economic appraisal or some other decision analysis technique. 
The entire project should be objectively appraised for the same feasibility study should be taken in its principal dimensions, technical, economic, financial, social and so far to establish the justification of the project or project appraisal is the process of judging whether the project is profitable or not to client or it is a process of detailed examination of several aspects of a given project before recommending of some projects.

Process
 Initial assessments
 Define problem and long-list 
 Consult and short-list 
 Evaluate alternatives
 Compare and select project appraisal.

Types of appraisal
 Technical appraisal
 Project appraisal
 Legal appraisal
 Environment appraisal
 Commercial and marketing appraisal
 Financial/economic appraisal
 Organizational or management appraisal
 Cost-benefit analysis
 Economic appraisal
 Cost-effectiveness analysis
 Scoring and weighting.

See also
Feasibility study

References

Project management
Evaluation methods